The following is a list of settlements in Sri Lanka with a population between 5,000 and 50,000.

Towns

References

External links

 
Sri Lanka
Towns
Towns